Geoffrey Cronjé (30 December 1907 – 23 January 1992) was a South African professor of sociology at the University of Pretoria and one of the founders of the apartheid system in South Africa.

Cronjé believed since Afrikaners lived as a minority in South Africa, blacks and whites could not peacefully co exist, he considered this to be unjust and unChristian and proposed an ideology called apartheid where blacks and whites were strictly segregated.

References

1907 births
1992 deaths
20th-century South African politicians
Afrikaner people
Apartheid government
South African politicians
South African people of Dutch descent
South African sociologists
Stellenbosch University alumni
Academic staff of the University of Pretoria
National Party (South Africa) politicians